Bae Noo-ri (born February 4, 1993) is a South Korean actress. She began modeling in 2008 for the brand Litmus, then made her acting debut in 2010. Bae is best known for playing a shaman in a period television series Moon Embracing the Sun.

Filmography

Television series

Films

Music video

Awards and nominations

References

External links
  
 
 

1993 births
Living people
South Korean film actresses
South Korean television actresses